Thomas Gavan-Duffy (25 September 1867 – 4 August 1932) was an Irish trade unionist and politician. He served as the Member of Parliament (MP) for Whitehaven from 1922 to 1924.

Born in Dublin, Gavan-Duffy was educated by the Christian Brothers there and became a district delegate for the Shop Assistants' Union. For 23 years he was general secretary of the Cumberland Iron Ore Miners' Association.

He unsuccessfully contested the Whitehaven constituency in 1918, won it in 1922, and lost it again in 1924.

References

External links 
 

1867 births
1932 deaths
English trade unionists
Irish trade unionists
Labour Party (UK) MPs for English constituencies
Politicians from County Dublin
UK MPs 1922–1923
UK MPs 1923–1924